Tailwind is the debut studio album of Australian singer songwriter Harmony James.

The songs were inspired in the time Harmony spent alone in the Barkly Tableland region of the Northern Territory.

Tailwind was re released in 2012 through Warner Music Australia which included two bonus tracks one being a cover of the Oasis (band) song "Don't Look Back in Anger".

Track listing

 Produced and engineered by Herm Kovac

Personnel
 Glen Wilson: drums
 Rudi Miranda: drums
 Ian Lees: bass
 Glenn Hannah:electric guitars, mando guitar
 Stuart French:acoustic guitars, electric guitars
 James Gillard: acoustic guitars, electric guitars, upright bass, backing vocals
 Travis Collins: electric guitars, banjo, backing vocals
 Michel Rose: pedal steel, dobro, mandolin
 Tim Crouch: fiddle, mandolin
 Mick Albeck: fiddle
 Marcus Hartstein: cello
 Lisa Pallandi: violins
 Clayton Doley: Hammond organ, melotron
 Bill Risbey: piano
 Randall Waller: backing vocals
 Shanley Del: backing vocals
 Kevin Bennertt: duet on Some People Give
 Hank Kovac: cowbell, xylophone, penny whistle

References

 

2009 albums
Warner Music Australasia albums
Harmony James albums